The 1994–95 Buffalo Sabres season was the Sabres' 25th season in the National Hockey League. The season was marked by injuries to star forwards Dale Hawerchuk and Pat LaFontaine, who each missed over half of the lockout-shortened season. Donald Audette, Alexander Mogilny and Wayne Presley filled the offensive hole left by the absence of LaFontaine and Hawerchuk, as Audette led the team in goals (24), Mogilny led in assists (28) and points (47) and Presley led in shorthanded goals (5). Thanks to Presley's contribution in this offensive category, the Sabres tied the Washington Capitals with the most shorthanded goals scored by any team during the regular season (13). Dominik Hasek led all goaltenders in save percentage with .930, goals against average with 2.11 (tied with Rick Tabaracci of the Washington Capitals/Calgary Flames) and shutouts with 5 (tied with Ed Belfour of the Chicago Blackhawks). The Sabres were one of only three teams (the other two being the Toronto Maple Leafs and the Quebec Nordiques) not to be shut out in any of their regular season games or playoff games.

On April 4, 1995, the Sabres scored three short-handed goals in a 6–3 home win over the Hartford Whalers.

The team's playoff run was brief, as they were eliminated in the first round by the Philadelphia Flyers in five games.

Off-season

Regular season
The Sabres scored the fewest even-strength goals during the regular season (72).

Season standings

Schedule and results

Playoffs
1995 Stanley Cup playoffs

Player statistics

Regular season
Scoring

Goaltending

Playoffs
Scoring

Goaltending

Note: Pos = Position; GP = Games played; G = Goals; A = Assists; Pts = Points; +/- = plus/minus; PIM = Penalty minutes; PPG = Power-play goals; SHG = Short-handed goals; GWG = Game-winning goals
      MIN = Minutes played; W = Wins; L = Losses; T = Ties; GA = Goals-against; GAA = Goals-against average; SO = Shutouts; SA = Shots against; SV = Shots saved; SV% = Save percentage;

Awards and records
 Dominik Hasek, Nominee, Hart Memorial Trophy
 Dominik Hasek, Vezina Trophy
 Dominik Hasek, NHL First Team All-Star

Draft picks

References
 Sabres on Hockey Database

Buffalo Sabres seasons
B
B
Buffalo
Buffalo